Lundagård may refer to:
 Lundagård (park), a park in central Lund, Sweden
 Lundagård (newspaper), the oldest Swedish student newspaper still in circulation, published by the Lund University Student Union (LUS)